Dominic A. LeBlanc  (born December 14, 1967) is a Canadian lawyer and politician who has served as the minister of intergovernmental affairs since 2020 and also became the minister of infrastructure and communities in 2021. A member of the Liberal Party, LeBlanc sits as the member of Parliament (MP) for Beauséjour, representing the New Brunswick riding in the House of Commons since 2000. He has held a number of Cabinet portfolios throughout his tenure in government.

LeBlanc ran for the leadership of the Liberal Party in 2008 but dropped out of the race to endorse Michael Ignatieff, who was later acclaimed leader. With the resignation of Ignatieff after the 2011 federal election LeBlanc was considered a likely candidate in the race to succeed him as party leader, but did not run.

LeBlanc served as the Leader of the Government in the House of Commons in the Cabinet of Prime Minister Justin Trudeau from 2015 to 2016. He served as Minister of Fisheries, Oceans and the Canadian Coast Guard from 2016 to 2018 and Minister of Intergovernmental Affairs, Northern Affairs and Internal Trade from 2018 to 2019. He has served as President of the Queen's Privy Council for Canada from 2018 to 2021 and began a second stint as Minister of Intergovernmental Affairs in 2020. After the 2021 federal election, LeBlanc remained as minister of intergovernmental affairs but also became minister of infrastructure and communities.

Early life and education 
LeBlanc was born in 1967, of
Acadian descent, in Ottawa, Ontario, to Joslyn "Lyn" ( Carter) and Roméo LeBlanc, a former MP, senator and 25th governor general of Canada.

As a child, he baby-sat the children of then-prime minister Pierre Trudeau. He remained friends with Justin Trudeau and endorsed Trudeau's candidacy for Liberal leader in 2012.

LeBlanc attended Lisgar Collegiate Institute for high school. He earned a Bachelor of Arts degree in political science from the University of Toronto (Trinity College), a Bachelor of Laws degree from the University of New Brunswick, and then attended Harvard Law School, where he obtained his Master of Laws degree. LeBlanc worked as a barrister and solicitor with Clark Drummie in Shediac and Moncton. From 1993 to 1996, LeBlanc was a Special Advisor to the Prime Minister Jean Chrétien.

Political career 
LeBlanc is member of the Liberal Party of Canada in the House of Commons of Canada, representing the riding of Beauséjour in New Brunswick.

LeBlanc first ran in that riding in 1997, losing to New Democratic Party candidate, Angela Vautour. During that race there were accusations of political patronage as LeBlanc's father was the sitting viceroy, and there was criticism that the governor general had a series of events planned in New Brunswick the very week that the election writs dropped.

In 2000 LeBlanc once again ran against Vautour, who had crossed the floor and was a Progressive Conservative, and was elected. LeBlanc has been re-elected in the 2004 (where he faced Vautour for the third time), 2006, 2008, 2011, 2015, 2019, and 2021.

Chrétien and Martin governments 
During the Liberal Party's time in power LeBlanc served as Parliamentary Secretary to the Minister of National Defence, from January 13, 2003, to December 11, 2003, and was the chair of the Atlantic Caucus.

On July 10, 2004, he was sworn in as a Member of the Privy Council for Canada and appointed Parliamentary Secretary to the leader of the Government in the House of Commons and deputy chief government whip. He has served on the Special Committee on Non-Medical Use of Drugs, and the Standing Committees on Fisheries and Oceans, Transport and Government Operations, National Defence and Veterans Affairs, and Public Accounts, Procedures and House Affairs, and International Trade.

In opposition 
In January 2006, he was named Official Opposition critic for international trade and later that year he was co-chair of the 2006 Liberal Party leadership convention in Montreal. In January 2007, he was named by the Honourable Stéphane Dion, Vice Chair – Liberal Party of Canada Policy and Platform Committee and In October of that year, he was named Official Opposition critic for intergovernmental affairs. In January 2009, he was named by Michael Ignatieff as the critic for justice and attorney general. Before the return of Parliament in September 2010, Ignatieff shuffled his Shadow Cabinet and appointed LeBlanc as the Liberal critic for national defence. Following LeBlanc's re-election in the 2011 federal election, interim Liberal leader Bob Rae appointed LeBlanc as the Liberal Party's foreign affairs critic.

2008 leadership bid 

On October 27, 2008, LeBlanc was the first candidate to officially announce his intention to seek the leadership of the Liberal party to replace Stéphane Dion. Former leadership candidates Michael Ignatieff and Bob Rae came forward shortly after LeBlanc's announcement. His supporters included top staffers in the prime minister's office under Jean Chrétien, such as his former chief of staff Percy Downe, and Tim Murphy, chief of staff under Paul Martin. Some senior organizers in Gerard Kennedy's 2006 leadership bid were also with LeBlanc.

On December 8, 2008, LeBlanc announced he was dropping out of the leadership race because he felt a leader needed to be put in place as soon as possible and that he was throwing his support behind Ignatieff. The next day Rae dropped out of the race and Ignatieff was acclaimed leader when Dion stepped down.

2011–2015 
LeBlanc retained his seat in the 2011 election, while the Liberals dropped down to third place in the House of Commons.

Regarding the race for the leadership of the Liberal Party, LeBlanc, a prospective leadership candidate, puts it, the next leader needs to commit 10 to 15 years of his or her life "occupied exclusively" with rebuilding the Liberal party and winning elections.

Trudeau government

42nd Canadian Parliament
On November 4, 2015, he was appointed the leader of the Government in the House of Commons in the present Cabinet, headed by Justin Trudeau. On May 31, 2016, upon the resignation of Hunter Tootoo from the Ministry, LeBlanc also became the Minister of Fisheries, Oceans and the Canadian Coast Guard. His father had previously held the equivalent position under Prime Minister Pierre Trudeau.

On August 19, 2016, Leblanc was replaced as leader of the Government in the House of Commons by Bardish Chagger. He retained the post of Minister of Fisheries, Oceans and the Canadian Coast Guard.

On July 18, 2018, Leblanc was shuffled from Minister of Fisheries, Oceans and the Canadian Coast Guard to Minister of Intergovernmental Affairs, Northern Affairs and Internal Trade, a combination of two positions, Intergovernmental Affairs and Youth, and Northern Affairs.

On September 12, 2018, the ethics commissioner, Mario Dion found LeBlanc broke conflict of interest rules when he awarded a lucrative Arctic surf clam licence to a company linked to his wife's cousin in February 2018.

On April 26, 2019, Leblanc announced he would be stepping back from cabinet as he sought treatment for cancer.

43rd Canadian Parliament
On November 20, 2019, Leblanc returned to Cabinet as President of the Queen's Privy Council for Canada, a position with reduced responsibilities. His former role as Minister of Intergovernmental Affairs, Northern Affairs and Internal Trade, was split between the Minister of Northern Affairs, and the Minister of Intergovernmental Affairs.

After the resignation of Bill Morneau as Minister of Finance, Leblanc again became Minister of Intergovernmental Affairs after his successor, Chrystia Freeland, took the role of Minister of Finance in a cabinet shuffle on August 18, 2020. He retained his position as President of the Queen's Privy Council for Canada.

44th Canadian Parliament
As of 31 August 2022, Leblanc sat on seven of the 13 cabinet committees then extant:
 Cabinet Committee on Agenda, Results and Communications
 Sub-Committee on Intergovernmental Coordination
 Cabinet Committee on Operations
 Sub-Committee on Litigation Management
 Cabinet Committee on Economy, Inclusion and Climate “B”
 Sub-Committee on the federal response to the Coronavirus disease (COVID-19)
 Task Force on Services to Canadians

Cabinet positions

Electoral record

Notes

Personal life 
In 2003, he married Jolène Richard, a former Moncton lawyer who became a judge on the Provincial Court of New Brunswick in 2008, and eventually became a chief judge. She is the daughter of Guy A. Richard, who served as Chief Justice of the Court of Queen's Bench of New Brunswick. He has an adult stepson.

In December 2017, he announced that he had been diagnosed with chronic lymphocytic leukemia and would begin chemotherapy immediately while continuing to serve in his parliamentary roles.

Arms

References

External links 

 
 
 Bio & mandate from Prime Minister
 

1967 births
Living people
Lawyers in New Brunswick
Members of the House of Commons of Canada from New Brunswick
Liberal Party of Canada MPs
Members of the King's Privy Council for Canada
Acadian people
Politicians from Ottawa
University of Toronto alumni
Trinity College (Canada) alumni
Harvard Law School alumni
People from Moncton
People from Shediac
University of New Brunswick alumni
Members of the 29th Canadian Ministry
Lisgar Collegiate Institute alumni
Canadian republicans